Carlo Sibilia (born 7 February 1986) is an Italian politician who has been an MP from the Five Star Movement since 2013.

References 

Living people
1986 births
21st-century Italian politicians
Five Star Movement politicians
Deputies of Legislature XVII of Italy
Deputies of Legislature XVIII of Italy
Moon landing conspiracy theorists